is a Japanese international rugby union player who plays as a Hooker.

References

External links

1993 births
Living people
Japanese rugby union players
Japan international rugby union players
Rugby union hookers
Saitama Wild Knights players
Sunwolves players